Joseph Amoah (born 4 April 1981) is a former professional footballer who played as a midfielder. Born in Ghana, he represented the Liberia national team.

International career
Amoah made his senior debut for Liberia on 2 August 1998.

References 

1981 births
Living people
People with acquired Liberian citizenship
Liberian footballers
Association football midfielders
Junior Professional FC players
MKE Ankaragücü footballers
Sabah F.C. (Malaysia) players
Göztepe S.K. footballers
Çetinkaya Türk S.K. players
Panthrakikos F.C. players
Gönyeli S.K. players
Süper Lig players
Liberia international footballers
Liberian expatriate footballers
Liberian expatriate sportspeople in Turkey
Expatriate footballers in Turkey
Liberian expatriate sportspeople in Malaysia
Expatriate footballers in Malaysia
Liberian expatriate sportspeople in Northern Cyprus
Expatriate footballers in Northern Cyprus
Liberian expatriate sportspeople in Indonesia
Expatriate footballers in Indonesia
Liberian expatriate sportspeople in Greece
Expatriate footballers in Greece
Liberian expatriate sportspeople in India
Expatriate footballers in India
Footballers from Accra
Ghanaian footballers
F.C. Nania players
Ghanaian expatriate footballers
Ghanaian expatriate sportspeople in Turkey
Ghanaian expatriate sportspeople in Malaysia
Ghanaian expatriate sportspeople in Northern Cyprus
Ghanaian expatriate sportspeople in Indonesia
Ghanaian expatriate sportspeople in Greece
Ghanaian expatriate sportspeople in India
Ghanaian people of Liberian descent
Sportspeople of Liberian descent